Charles Lane (born December 26, 1953) is an American actor and filmmaker.

While attending Purchase College as a film student, he made a short titled A Place in Time based on the famous Kitty Genovese incident. This short gained him a certain amount of attention, including a Student Academy Award win.

Lane then directed and starred in feature films True Identity, a vehicle for British comedian Lenny Henry funded by the Walt Disney Company. He wrote, directed and starred in 1989's Sidewalk Stories, a black-and-white feature about a homeless street artist who becomes the guardian of a small girl after her father is murdered. The nearly silent film was an homage to Charlie Chaplin's The Kid and was a critical favorite. It won several festival awards, including the Prix du Publique at the Cannes Film Festival, where its 12-minute ovation set a new record. He also received three nominations at the Film Independent Spirit Awards: Best Director, Best First Feature and Best Male Lead On its 25th anniversary in 2014, Sidewalk Stories was digitally remastered and rescreened at the Cannes Film Festival and Tribeca Film Festival.

Lane also had a starring role in the Mario Van Peebles film Posse, as Weezie, often the butt of jokes.

He has worked with James Earl Jones, Lenny Henry, and Frank Langella and offered one of the first film roles to The Sopranos actress Edie Falco. Lane often casts various friends and family in his films, including brother Gerald, friend George, and daughter Nicole Alysia.

Filmography

Film

Television

Awards and nominations

References

External links

1953 births
Living people
African-American male actors
American male actors
African-American film directors
People from the Bronx
People from Dobbs Ferry, New York
State University of New York at Purchase alumni
Film directors from New York City
21st-century African-American people
20th-century African-American people